A Hero Ain't Nothin' but a Sandwich is a 1973 young adult novel by American author Alice Childress.

Plot
Benjie is a 13-year-old, living in the urban ghetto of the 1970s, who succumbs to the allure of heroin. Encouraged by his friends, Benjie gets hooked on the dangerous monster that is slowly dictating his life. Everyone is urging him to stop but he cannot, as he is addicted to the drug. He disdains his counselors and teachers. After a final confrontation with his stepfather, he promises to quit.

Awards and nominations
A Hero Ain't Nothin' but a Sandwich won an ALA Coretta Scott King Award honor, the Lewis Carroll Shelf Award, and the Jane Addams Award for a young adult novel.

Reception
Ed Bullins in The New York Times commented: "This surprisingly exciting, entertaining book demystifies the pusher and the problem he sells by centering on the unwitting victim, Benjie, and the disintegration of a black family. With their own voices the people in this story tell the truths of their lives. The writer uses her considerable dramatic talents to expose a segment of society seldom spoken of above a whisper; she exposes the urban disease that hides behind the headlines of drug abuse, the child junkies, drug rehabilitation programs and the problem of sheer survival in the black urban community." Kirkus Reviews called the novel "An unusually honest and forceful novel, told in trenchant language by a variety of people concerned with thirteen year-old Benjie."

Censorship
In 1975, the book was removed from high school library shelves by the board of education of the Island Trees Union Free School District in New York. This case became the subject of a U.S. Supreme Court case in 1982.

Film adaptation
The book was adapted into a film in 1977 starring Cicely Tyson and Paul Winfield and directed by Ralph Nelson.

References

1970 American novels
Novels about heroin addiction
American young adult novels
African-American young adult novels
American novels adapted into films
African-American novels
Coward-McCann books
Censored books